Dewberry is an unincorporated community in Brown Township, Ripley County, in the U.S. state of Indiana.

History
A post office was established at Dewberry in 1882, and remained in operation until it was discontinued in 1887.

Geography

References

Unincorporated communities in Ripley County, Indiana
Unincorporated communities in Indiana